The Greefspan II Solar Power Station, also Greefspan 2 Solar Power Station, is a  solar power plant in South Africa. It is a grid-connected, privately owned and privately funded solar power station. The solar farm began commercial operations in September 2021. The power station, whose construction started in 2018, was completed in December 2020. The nine months between completion and commercial commissioning were spent performing "grid connection tests" and other calibrations.

Location
The power station is located near the village of Higgs' Hope, 
in the Pixley ka Seme District Municipality, in the Northern Cape Province of South Africa. This is approximately half-way between the towns of Prieska and Douglas.

The geographical coordinates of Greefspan II Solar Power Station are 29°23'08.0"S, 23°18'54.0"E (Latitude:-29.385556; Longitude:23.315000).

Overview
The power station comprises  188,822 solar panels, capable of collectively generating 150 GWh annually, enough to supply 20,000 South African homes. The power is evacuated via a high voltage transmission line to a location where Eskom, the national electricity utility company of South Africa integrates it into the national grid. This renewable energy infrastructure prioject is expected to save South Africa an estimated 130 000 tonnes of carbon dioxide emissions every year.

Developers
The power station was developed by a consortium, which owns the station. For descriptive purposes we will call that consortium: Greefspan II Solar Consortium. The consortium comprises the corporate entities listed in the table below.

Other considerations
This power station was licensed under the fourth round of the Renewable Energy Independent Power Purchasing Programme (REIPPP). This program was designed by the Government of South Africa, with the objective of attracting "private investment in the renewable energy sector".

Construction
The engineering, procurement and construction (EPC) contract was awarded to the Spanish company GRS Energy, a subsidiary of the Gransolar Group. Construction began in 2018 and concluded in December 2020. GRS Energy employed 700 workers at the height of construction, and will continue to operate and manage the power station, with a smaller number of local employees.

See also

List of power stations in South Africa
Boikanyo Solar Power Station

References

External links
 GRS achieves COD for the Greefspan II photovoltaic plant As of 17 September 2021.

Solar power stations in South Africa
Pixley ka Seme District Municipality
Economy of the Northern Cape
2021 establishments in South Africa
Energy infrastructure completed in 2021
21st-century architecture in South Africa